Jim Robison (born 1942) is a professional American bridge and poker player from Los Angeles, California.

Bridge accomplishments

Wins

 North American Bridge Championships (6)
 Lebhar IMP Pairs (1) 1998 
 Fast Open Pairs (1) 2001 
 Silodor Open Pairs (1) 1985 
 Keohane North American Swiss Teams (2) 1979, 1990 
 Reisinger (1) 1984

Runners-up

 North American Bridge Championships
 Rockwell Mixed Pairs (1) 1987 
 Silodor Open Pairs (1) 1980 
 Jacoby Open Swiss Teams (1) 1982 
 Vanderbilt (1) 2005 
 Senior Knockout Teams (1) 2001

Notes

Living people
American contract bridge players
1942 births
Place of birth missing (living people)
Date of birth missing (living people)
People from Los Angeles